The 2014–15 Hazfi Cup was the 28th season of the Iranian football knockout competition. Tractor Sazi was the defending champion but was eliminated by Padideh in quarter-finals. The competition started on 1 September 2014 and ended on 1 June 2015. Zob Ahan won their third title after defeating Naft Tehran in the final.

Participating teams
Totally 102 teams participated in the 2014–15 season. These teams were divided into four main groups which are introduced here. Teams in bold were still active in the competition:

16 teams of Iran Pro League:

24 teams of Azadegan League:

28 teams of Iran Football's 2nd Division:

34 teams from Provincial League:

First stage
In the first stage of "2014–15 Hazfi Cup", 96 teams were present. Three rounds were played in this stage and finally 13 teams qualified for the second stage.

First round
The first round started with 34 teams that contained the champions of each province in the Provincial League, in addition to Khoramshahr and Kish Island's champion and Tehran's runner-up. Out of these, 20 teams qualified for the second round, six teams had rest and qualified for the second stage directly.

Second round
For the second round, twenty qualified teams faced each other and 10 teams qualified for the third round.

Third round
For the third round, ten qualified teams from second round faced 24 teams from Azadegan League and 28 from Iran Football's 2nd Division. Two teams had rest and 60 teams faced each other and 32 teams qualified for the fourth round.

Fourth round
For the fourth round, 32 qualified teams faced each other and finally, 16 teams qualified for the second stage.

{{Footballbox collapsible
|bg           = 
|stack        = yes
|round        = 62
|date         = 
|time         = 14:45 DST+03:30
|team1        = Pas Hamedan
|score        = 4 – 0
|aet          = 
|report       = 
|team2        = Be'sat Kermanshah|goals1       = 
|goals2       = 
|stadium      = Qods Stadium
|location     = Hamedan
|attendance   = 8,000
|referee      = 
|penalties1   = 
|penaltyscore = 
|penalties2   = 
}}

Second stage
The 16 teams from Iran Pro League entered the competition from the second stage.

Fifth round (round of 32)

Sixth round (round of 16)

Quarter-Final (1/4 Final - Last 8)

Semi-final (1/2 final – last 4)

Final

 Bracket Note:   '  H: Home team,   A: Away team''

Top scorers

See also 
 Iran Pro League 2014–15
 Azadegan League 2014–15
 Iran Football's 2nd Division 2014–15
 Iran Football's 3rd Division 2014–15
 Iranian Super Cup
 Futsal Super League 2014–15

References

2014
Hazfi Cup
Hazfi Cup